The Poppies Say GRRrrr! is the first release by British grebo band Pop Will Eat Itself. It was originally released on 7" vinyl in a brown paper bag, of which only 500 copies were produced for sale at a concert, however, it was later repressed onto a 7" vinyl with an orange printed sleeve.

The EP contained five short songs which were all later released on a version of Poppiecock, the following release by the band. They also appeared in the 1988 compilation "Now For A Feast!". These songs had the sound distinctive of early Pop Will Eat Itself, with simple chord structures and rhythms, driven by vintage-style distorted electric guitar. This style persisted until 1987, when the drummer, Graham Crabb, switched to a lead vocal role and the band became abruptly more electronic.

Track listing
All songs composed by Vestan Pance.

Side One
 "I'm Sniffin' With You Hoo" 0:53
 "Sick Little Girl" 2:29
Side Two
 "Mesmerized" 1:27
 "Theresapsychopathin My Soup" 1:05
 "Candydiosis" 1:00

References

External links
 http://www.popwilleatitself.co.uk/the-poppies-say-grrrrr/#.VaoUefmqoSX
 http://pweination.com/pwei/

1986 EPs
Pop Will Eat Itself albums